Czesław Wołłejko (17 March 1916 – 7 February 1987) was a Polish actor. He appeared in more than twenty films from 1952 to 1984.

Selected filmography

References

External links

1916 births
1987 deaths
Polish male film actors
Recipients of the State Award Badge (Poland)